The Emery Street Bungalow Historic District is located in Eau Claire, Wisconsin, United States. It was added to the National Register of Historic Places in 1983.

History
Contributing buildings in the district were constructed from 1915 to 1930.

References

Eau Claire, Wisconsin
Houses on the National Register of Historic Places in Wisconsin
Houses in Eau Claire, Wisconsin
Historic districts on the National Register of Historic Places in Wisconsin
National Register of Historic Places in Eau Claire County, Wisconsin